The 2017–18 Pacific Tigers men's basketball team represented the University of the Pacific during the 2017–18 NCAA Division I men's basketball season. The Tigers were led by second-year head coach Damon Stoudamire and played their home games at the Alex G. Spanos Center in Stockton, California as members of the West Coast Conference. They finished the season 14–18, 9–9 in WCC play to finish in a three-way tie for fourth place. They lost in the first round of the WCC tournament to San Francisco.

Previous season 
The Tigers finished the 2016–17 season 11–22, 4–14 in WCC play to finish in ninth place. They defeated Pepperdine in the first round of the WCC tournament to advance to the quarterfinals where they lost to Gonzaga.

Offseason

Departures

Incoming transfers

Recruiting Class of 2017

Roster

Schedule and results

|-
!colspan=9 style=|Exhibition

|-
!colspan=9 style=| Non-conference regular season

|-
!colspan=9 style=| WCC regular season

|-
!colspan=9 style=| WCC tournament

References

Pacific Tigers men's basketball seasons
Pacific
Pacific
Pacific